The Canecão is an indoor arena located in Botafogo, Rio de Janeiro, Brazil. The venue opened in 1967 which was capable of functioning alternatively either as a dance floor or a concert hall (seating capacity: 2000). It has been closed since 2010, due to legal quarrels over its ownership.

Along more than 4 decades the venue has hosted a legion of notable artists, such as Pixinguinha, Tom Jobim, Elis Regina, Baden Powell de Aquino, Chico Buarque, Roberto Carlos, Wilson Simonal, Maysa, Marisa Monte, Ray Charles, Black Sabbath, Jethro Tull, The Ramones, MPB-4 and Quarteto em Cy.

On June 4, 2019, the Canecão was de-bombed, as a result of an appeal by UFRJ to the Legislative Assembly of the State of Rio de Janeiro (Alerj). The de-bombing was necessary in view of the need to regularize the use of the area and to continue the partnership with the BNDES, the project called VivaUFRJ, whose focus is to enhance the university's heritage.

References

Music venues in Rio de Janeiro (city)
Indoor arenas in Brazil